The maund, mun or mann is the anglicized name for a traditional unit of mass used in British India, and also in Afghanistan, Persia, and Arabia: the same unit in the Mughal Empire was sometimes written as mann or mun in English, while the equivalent unit in the Ottoman Empire and Central Asia was called the batman. At different times, and in different South Asian localities, the mass of the maund has varied, from as low as 25 pounds (11 kg) to as high as 160 pounds (72 kg): even greater variation is seen in Persia and Arabia.

History

In British India, the maund was first standardized in the Bengal Presidency in 1833, where it was set equal to 100 Troy pounds (82.28 lbs. av.). This standard spread throughout the British Raj. After the independence of India and Pakistan, the definition formed the basis for metrication, one maund becoming exactly 37.3242 kilograms. A similar metric definition is used in Bangladesh and Nepal. Throughout Bangladesh, one মন/mun/mann is 40 kg. In Nepal’s southern plains one Mann equals 40 kilograms and is generally used to measure agricultural output.

The Old English, 'maund' may also be the origin of Maundy Thursday. As a verb, 'maund' :  to beg; as a noun, 'a maund' : a small basket held out for alms.

South Asia

Delhi Sultanate 

During the reign of Alauddin Khalji of the Delhi Sultanate, 1 mann was roughly equivalent to 15 kg.

Mughal Empire
Prinsep (1840) summarizes the evidence as to the weight of the mun (later "maund") during the reign (1556–1605) of Akbar the Great, which comes from the Ain-i-Akbari written by the vizier Abu'l-Fazl ibn Mubarak (anglicized as "Abul Fuzl"). The principal definition is that the mun is forty seers; and that each seer is thirty dams.
1 mun = 40 seers = 1200 dams
The problem arises in assigning the values of the smaller units. 

The section of the Ain-i-Akbari that defines the mun also defines the dam as five tanks. A separate section defines the tank as twenty-four ruttees. However, by the 19th century, the tank was no longer a uniform unit across the former Mughal territories: Prinsep quotes values of 50 grains (3.24 g) in Darwar, 72 grains (4.67 g) in Bombay and 268 grains (17.37 g) in Ahmednugur. 

The jilály, a square silver rupee coin issued by Akbar, was said by the Ain-i-Akbari to be 11¼ mashas in weight: surviving jilály and other Mughal rupee coins weigh 170–175 Troy grains (11.02–11.34 g), so the masha, defined as eight ruttees, would be about 15½ grains (1 g). Masha weights sent back to London in 1819 agree with this value. This basis gives a mun of 34¾ lb. av. (15.75 kg). One Koni was 4 muns.

However, in yet another section of the Ain-i-Akbari, the dam is said to be "twenty mashas seven ruttees": using this definition would imply an Imperial mass of about 47 lb. av. (21.3 kg) for the mun. Between these two values, the maund in Central India was often found to be around 40 lb. av. (18 kg) in the East India Company survey of 1821.

A Maund was 55.5 British pounds mass under Akbar.

Nineteenth century

Prinsep's values for the maund come from a survey organized by the East India Company in 1821. The Company's agents were asked to send back examples of the standard weights and measures used in the places they were stationed, and these were compared with the English standards in London by Patrick Kelly, the leading British metrologist of the time. The results were published as an appendix to the second edition of Kelly's Universal Cambist (1831), and later as a separate book entitled Oriental Metrology (1832).

It will be seen from Kelly's results below that Prinsep's generalizations are only partially correct. The Gujarat maund is more closely related to the Central Indian maund than to the standardized Bombay maund, except in the town of Anjar, except that it is divided into 40 seers instead of 20 as was found in Malwa.

Central India and Gujarat

Bombay Presidency

Madras Presidency

Maund was known as Mudi in Tulu language

Bengal

Notes

References

External links
Sizes.com
The maund in India (historical values)

Customary units in India
Units of mass